Charles Hunter may refer to:

Charles Hunter (athlete) (1892-1974), American Olympic athlete
Charles Hunter (composer) (1876–1906), American composer of ragtime music
Charles A. Hunter (1843–1912), American Civil War soldier awarded the Medal of Honor
Charles N. Hunter (educator) (1853?-1931),  Black educator, journalist, and historian 
Charles N. Hunter (1906–1978), U.S. Army officer and author
Sir Charles Hunter, 3rd Baronet (1858–1924), Member of Parliament for Bath, 1910–1918
Charles H. Hunter (soldier) (1817–1870), Pennsylvania militia officer and physician
Charles Hunter (physician) (1835–1878), doctor who coined the term "hypodermic" and conducted research into narcotic injections
Charles Hunter (cricketer) (1867–1955), English cricketer
Charles Hunter, a character in the novel Pirate Latitudes

See also
Charlie Hunter (born 1967), American guitarist, composer and bandleader
Charlie Hunter (trainer), trainer and driver of standardbred racehorses in New Zealand
Charlie Hunter (golfer) (1836–1921), Scottish golfer